Chlorine is a chemical element with symbol Cl and atomic number 17.

Chlorine may also refer to:

Arts, entertainment, and media

Films
 Chlorine (2013 film), an American film
 Chlorine (2015 film), an Italian film

Music
 "Chlorine" (song), from the album Trench (2018) by American band Twenty One Pilots
 "Chlorine", a song on the album Chemical Miracle by Trophy Eyes (2016)
 "Chlorine", a song on the album Hyperview by Title Fight (2015)

Other uses
 Chlorine acid
 Chlorine bleach
 Isotopes of chlorine

See also

 CL (disambiguation)